J60 may refer to:
 , a Hunt-class minesweeper of the Royal Navy
 , a Jan van Amstel-class minesweeper of the Royal Navy
 LNER Class J60, a British steam locomotive class
 Metabiaugmented dodecahedron
 Pratt & Whitney J60, a turbojet engine
 Toyota Land Cruiser (J60), a Japanese off-road vehicle